Russian Flu (Swedish: Ryska snuvan) is a 1937 Swedish comedy film directed by Gustaf Edgren and starring Åke Söderblom,  Karin Swanström and Sickan Carlsson. It was the second Swedish film of the Norwegian actress Kirsten Heiberg.

The film's sets were designed by the art director Arne Åkermark.

Main cast
 Åke Söderblom as Kalle Brodin  
 Karin Swanström as Mrs. Brodin  
 Sickan Carlsson as Bojan  
 Kirsten Heiberg as Nadja Ivanovna  
 Edvin Adolphson as Nikolajevitj  
 Anders Henrikson as Grischa  
 Erik 'Bullen' Berglund as Paul  
 Nils Jacobsson as Ernst Rolf  
 Olof Winnerstrand as Köhler  
 Ivar Kåge as Köhler's Friend  
 Olof Sandborg as Colonel  
 Katie Rolfsen as Ciceron  
 Eric Gustafson as Gulaschbaron  
 Elof Ahrle as Den svenske maskinreparatören i Moskva  
 Georg Rydeberg as A man 
 Tom Walter as Partikamrat  
 Holger Löwenadler as Socialdemokratisk talare  
 Viran Rydkvist as Petruschka

References

Bibliography 
 Per Olov Qvist & Peter von Bagh. Guide to the Cinema of Sweden and Finland. Greenwood Publishing Group, 2000.

External links

 

1937 films
1937 comedy films
Swedish comedy films
1930s Swedish-language films
Films directed by Gustaf Edgren
Swedish black-and-white films
1930s Swedish films